The 2011 Toledo Rockets football team represented the University of Toledo during the 2011 NCAA Division I FBS football season. The Rockets were led by third-year head coach Tim Beckman during the regular season and new head coach Matt Campbell for their bowl game. They competed in the West Division of the Mid-American Conference and played their home games at the Glass Bowl. They finished the season 9–4, 7–1 in MAC play to be West Division co–champions with Northern Illinois. Due to their loss to Northern Illinois, they did not represent the division in the MAC Championship Game. They were invited to the Military Bowl where they defeated Air Force 42–41.

At the end of the regular season, head coach Tim Beckman resigned to become the new head coach at Illinois. Offensive coordinator Matt Campbell was named as Beckman's replacement and coached the Rockets in the Military Bowl. Beckman finished at Toledo with a three-year record of 21–16.

Schedule

References

Toledo
Toledo Rockets football seasons
Military Bowl champion seasons
Toledo Rockets football